Torben Schmidtke (born 24 February 1989) is a German Paralympic swimmer who competes in international level events. He specialises in freestyle swimming and breaststroke swimming where he has won two Paralympic medals, two World medals and three European medals.

Schmidtke was born with dysmelia in his legs and has three fingers on his left hand, he had his right foot amputated in October 2018 due to severe pain relating to his health condition. As well as swimming, he works for the German Federal Police as an IT specialist in Potsdam.

References

External links
 
 

1989 births
Living people
Sportspeople from Schwerin
Paralympic swimmers of Germany
Swimmers at the 2012 Summer Paralympics
Swimmers at the 2016 Summer Paralympics
Medalists at the 2012 Summer Paralympics
Medalists at the 2016 Summer Paralympics
Medalists at the World Para Swimming Championships
Medalists at the World Para Swimming European Championships
German male breaststroke swimmers
S8-classified Paralympic swimmers
21st-century German people